Edward Coppée Mitchell (July 26, 1836 – January 25, 1887) was a professor and dean of the University of Pennsylvania Law School.

Biography
Mitchell was born in Savannah, Georgia. He graduated from the University of Pennsylvania in 1835. He worked in the law office of John C. Mitchell, and was admitted to the bar in October 1858.

He lived at 2015 Chestnut Street in Philadelphia, Pennsylvania. Mitchell was married, and had six children. He was a Democrat.

Mitchell was a professor of real estate, conveyancing, and equity jurisprudence and beginning in 1874 Dean of the University of Pennsylvania Law School, which he began teaching at in 1872.

He authored a number of legal books. Among them, Mitchell co-authored The law of real estate and conveyancing in Pennsylvania (1890) with Robert Ralston.

Mitchell was a senior member of the Masonic Order, and served as Right Worshipful Grand Master of the Grand Lodge of Pennsylvania from 1885-1886.  W.C. Fields was a member of E.  Coppée  Mitchell Lodge No. 605 in Philadelphia.

Mitchell suffered from bouts of pneumonia, and died of heart failure. He is buried in Laurel Hill Cemetery in Philadelphia.

References 

1836 births
1887 deaths
People from Savannah, Georgia
Lawyers from Philadelphia
Burials at Laurel Hill Cemetery (Philadelphia)
University of Pennsylvania alumni
Deans of University of Pennsylvania Law School
Masonic Grand Masters
American Freemasons
Pennsylvania Democrats
19th-century American lawyers